Statefields School Inc. (SSI) is a private, non-sectarian school located along the National Rd. in Molino III, Bacoor, Cavite.  It offers preschool, elementary, junior high school and senior high school education.

References

External links 
 
 WikiMapia Location

High schools in Cavite
Schools in Bacoor
2000 establishments in the Philippines